Darja Fedorovich (born 28 October 1992) is a Belarusian draughts player (Russian draughts, International draughts and Brazilian draughts), was third at the 2019 Women's World Draughts Championship (International draughts), was second and third at the world championship and twice second at European championship in Russian draughts. She has become the champion of Belarus many times. Darja Fedorovich is a Women's International grandmaster (GMIF) in draughts-64 and in International draughts. Coach Anatoli Gantvarg. Her sister Olga Fedorovich is also Belarusian draughts player.

Russian draughts

World Championship
 2011 (12 place in semifinal)
 2013 (4 place)
 2015 (4 place)
 2017 (3 place)
 2019 (2 place)

European Championship
 2008 (3 place)
 2014 (2 place)
 2016 (2 place)

Belarusian Championship
 2007, 2008, 2017 – (1 place)
 2009, 2013, 2014, 2016 – (2 place)
 2018 (3 place)

International draughts

World Championship
 2017 (5 place)
 2019 (3 place)
 2021 (8 place)

European Championship
 2012 (12 place)
 2016 (5 place)

Belarusian Championship
 2012, 2016 (1 place)
 2009–2011, 2015, 2018, 2019 – (3 place)

References

External links
 Profile FMJD
 Profile KNDB

Living people
1992 births
Players of international draughts
Belarusian draughts players